In sign languages, orientation is the distinctive relative degree of rotation of the hand when signing. Orientation is one of five components of a sign, along with handshape, location, movement, and nonmanual features.

See also
American Sign Language grammar

References

Sign language